ILS or ils may refer to:

Organizations
ILS Law College, of the Indian Law Society
International Launch Services
International Life Saving Federation
International Lenin School

Science and technology
 Iterated local search, in computing
 Instrument landing system, for aircraft
 Integrated library system, an enterprise resource planning system for libraries
 Internet Locator Server, for Microsoft NetMeeting

Business and military
 Integrated logistics support
 Inventory Locator Service, LLC, a digital aviation warehouse company
 ILS (company), a Finnish engineering company

Finance
 Insurance-Linked Securities (ILS)
 Israeli new shekel, ISO 4217 currency code

Other uses 
Inscriptiones Latinae Selectae, a book of Latin inscriptions
 Ils (musician)
Them (2006 film) (French: Ils), a French horror film